Rockybranch is an unincorporated community in Wayne County, in the U.S. state of Kentucky.

History
Rockybranch once had its own post office and school. The community took its name from nearby Rocky Branch.

References

Unincorporated communities in Wayne County, Kentucky
Unincorporated communities in Kentucky